Luke Calleja (born 3 July 1985), professionally known as Kronic is an Australian DJ, record producer, songwriter and remixer. He is most known for producing and co-writing Lil Jon’s Bend Ova. His remix and production credits includes records for Lady Gaga, Jennifer Lopez, R Kelly, Austin Mahone, Lil Jon, Pitbull, Enrique Iglesias and Nervo. He released his debut EP "Sophisticated Ignorance" in 2016. In 2017 his collaboration with Far East Movement and Savage, Push, was used in the trailer for the upcoming "The Fast And The Furious" film, which premiered to over 100 million viewers during the 2017 Super Bowl.

Early life
Calleja was born and raised in Adelaide, South Australia

Music career

2013–2015 
In July 2013, Kronic was placed the 49th top ranked National DJ in Australia by the 'In The Mix Awards'.

In January 2014 Kronic was hand picked to remix Lady Gaga's second single 'Do What You Want' from her third studio album Artpop (2013).

on July 22, 2014 'Bend Ova' was released as a single by American rapper and producer Lil Jon as the follow-up to his highly successful single "Turn Down for What". The track features a guest verse by American rapper Tyga and was produced by Lil Jon and Australian DJ and producer Kronic.

On July 15, 2015 Kronic released 'Beast" alongside Lil Jon Feat. Señor Roar.

In November 2015 Kronic was chosen by Ministry of Sound to mix the 'Annual 2015' alongside Ember and Dom Dolla, which was listed as number 10 on the 2015 ARIA Charts albums compilation chart. In 2016 he was chosen by Ministry of Sound to mix the 'Annual 2016' alongside Ember and Dom Dolla again, which was listed as number 17 on the 2016 ARIA Charts albums compilation chart.

2016–2017 
In 2016, he released his latest EP Sophisticated Ignorance which was featured on highly acclaimed blogs such as Pilerats and MTV. The First single that came off the EP: Sophisticated Ignorance was 'Blood In The Water' Featuring Nikki Jean.

In 2016 it was announced Kronic had been working on new material with Justin Bieber, the project is still unreleased.

In July 2016, Kronic released 'Bad Bitches' alongside Lil Jon feat. Keno.

In March 2017 Kronic produced "Sexy Body" (with Jennifer Lopez) and "Dedicated" (featuring R. Kelly and Austin Mahone) on Pitbull's tenth studio album Climate Change.

In April 2017 Kronic released 'Rendezvous' featuring Leon Thomas III.

Film & Television
In 2016, his tracks "Feel That" and "Bad Bitches" were featured in the second season of HBO’s Ballers

In 2017, his 2015 collaboration with Far East Movement and Savage, Push, was used in the trailer for The Fate of the Furious film, which premiered to over 100 million viewers during this past January's Super Bowl.

Kronic's 2016 collaboration with Lil Jon was featured in the 2017 Film Girls Trip

Sup Girl Records
In 2014 Kronic teamed up with Krunk to launch their own record label, Sup Girl Records, which has released music from artists including Far East Movement, JaySounds, Lil Jon, G-Wizard, Spenda C, and others. Sup Girl Record label is a joint venture with the Australia-based EDM label Central Station Records which is based out of the Australian Ministry of Sound offices.

Discography

Artist / Production

Remixes

References 

Australian record producers
1985 births
Living people